The Stockholm Concert, 1966 is a 1966 (see 1966 in music) live album by the American jazz singer Ella Fitzgerald, accompanied in part by the Duke Ellington Orchestra. The recording remained unreleased until 1984.

It is notable as the last release of Ella's four recorded collaborations with Duke Ellington. Later in 1966 Ella and Duke went on to record their final album together; Ella and Duke at the Cote D'Azur.

Track listing
Originally released in 1984 on LP and CD (Pablo 2308-242). Remastered reissue on CD in 1987 (Pablo PACD-2308-242-2 in US; Pablo 025218024228 in France/Benelux).

 "Imagine My Frustration" (Duke Ellington, Billy Strayhorn, Gerald Wilson) – 5:13
 "Duke's Place" (Ellington, Bob Katz, Bob Thiele) – 4:43
 "Satin Doll" (Ellington, Johnny Mercer, Strayhorn) – 3:08
 "Something to Live For (song)" (Ellington, Strayhorn) – 4:04
 "Wives and Lovers" (Burt Bacharach, Hal David) – 2:11
 "Só Danço Samba" ("Jazz 'n' Samba") (Antonio Carlos Jobim, Vinícius de Moraes, Norman Gimbel) – 4:14
 "Let's Do It (Let's Fall in Love)" (Cole Porter) – 4:09
 "Lover Man (Oh Where Can You Be?)" (Jimmy Davis, Ram Ramirez, Jimmy Sherman) – 4:50
 "Cotton Tail" (Ellington) – 5:01

Personnel
All tracks recorded on February 7, 1966, at the Stockholm Concert Hall, Sweden.
 
Ella Fitzgerald with Duke Ellington and His Orchestra on all tracks, but the orchestra's rhythm section (including Ellington) on tracks 3–8 is replaced by the Jimmy Jones Trio (on the cover referred to as “Ella's Trio”).

 Duke Ellington — piano (exc. tracks 3–8), arranger, bandleader
 William "Cat" Anderson, Mercer Ellington, Herb Jones, Cootie Williams— trumpet
 Lawrence Brown, Buster Cooper — trombone
 Chuck Connors — bass trombone
 Johnny Hodges — alto saxophone
 Russell Procope — alto saxophone, clarinet
 Paul Gonsalves — tenor saxophone
 Harry Carney — baritone saxophone, clarinet, bass clarinet
 Jimmy Hamilton — clarinet, tenor saxophone
 John Lamb — double bass (exc. tracks 3–8)
 Sam Woodyard — drums (exc. tracks 3–8)
 The Jimmy Jones Trio featured on tracks 3–8
 Jimmy Jones — piano
 Joe Comfort — double bass
 Gus Johnson — drums

Credits
Produced by Norman Granz
Digitally remastering in 1987 by Joe Tarantino at Fantasy Studios, Berkeley, CA.

References 

Duke Ellington live albums
Ella Fitzgerald live albums
Albums produced by Norman Granz
1984 live albums
Pablo Records live albums